Deportes Melipilla is a Chilean football club, based on Melipilla, a comune in the Santiago Metropolitan Region. It was founded on January 24, 1992, as a successor of Club Deportivo Soinca Bata. The club has its classic rival, San Antonio Unido match known as “Clásico del Maipo” or “The Maipo Derbi”.

Deportes Melipilla has its own stadium called Estadio Municipal Roberto Bravo Santibáñez situated in its city with a capacity of 6,000.

Deportes Melipilla were expelled from the ANFP on 27 December 2021 due to irregularities with the contracts of footballers.

Titles
Primera Division B: 2
2004, 2006

Seasons
4 seasons in Primera División
14 seasons in Primera B
1 season in Segunda División
2 seasons in Tercera División

Current squad

2022 Winter Transfers

In

Out

Managers
 1993  Juan Páez
 2000 – 2002  Gustavo Huerta
 2002 – 2005  Juan Ubilla
 2005  Guillermo Páez
 2006 – 2007  Luis Musrri
 2007 – 2008  Ronald Fuentes
 2008  José Díaz (intern)
 2008  Ricardo Dabrowski
 2008  José Díaz
 2009  Jorrit Smink
 2009  Emiliano Astorga
 2010 – 2011  Luis Abarca
 2011  Guillermo Páez
 2012  Orlando Mondaca
 2013 –  Luis Fredes
 2014 –  Nelson Cossio

See also
Chilean football league system

References

External links
Club Website 
Current Squad 
Team's Division 

 
Football clubs in Chile
Association football clubs established in 1992
Sport in Santiago Metropolitan Region
1992 establishments in Chile